Bongolava is a region in central-western Madagascar. The capital of the region is Tsiroanomandidy. It had a population of 674,474 in 2018.

Geography
The region is situated in central-western Madagascar. It is bordered by Betsiboka, Melaky, Menabe, Vakinankaratra, Itasy and Analamanga.

It is crossed by the Kiranomena River, Mahajilo River and Manambolo River and the Route nationale 1 (Madagascar).

Administrative divisions
Bongolava Region is divided into two districts, which are sub-divided into 24 communes.

 Fenoarivo-Afovoany District - 8 communes
 Tsiroanomandidy District - 16 communes

Transport

Airport
Tsiroanomandidy Airport

See also
 Antananarivo Province

References

External links
Bongolava unofficial site (in French)
Bongolava presentation (in French).
 Bongolava ong FAMI site (in French)

 
Regions of Madagascar